Euplexia benesimilis, the American angle shades, is a species of cutworm or dart moth in the family Noctuidae. It is found in North America.

The MONA or Hodges number for Euplexia benesimilis is 9545.

References

Further reading

 
 
 

Euplexia
Articles created by Qbugbot
Moths described in 1922